"Small Town Saturday Night" is a song written by Pat Alger and Hank DeVito, and recorded by American country music artist Hal Ketchum. It was released in April 1991 as the first single from his debut album Past the Point of Rescue. The song reached No. 2 on the Billboard Hot Country Singles & Tracks chart in August 1991.

Content
The song is an uptempo that describes what occurs on a Saturday night in a small town. The song was inspired by the city of New Braunfels, Texas.

Music video
The music video was directed by Senor McGuire and premiered in mid-1991. It is entirely in black-and-white, and shows the singer in a forest, singing beneath a screen showing The Terror of Tiny Town (1938). In the end, a horse dances with the singer.

Chart performance

Year-end charts

References

1991 debut singles
1991 songs
Hal Ketchum songs
Songs written by Pat Alger
Songs written by Hank DeVito
Song recordings produced by Allen Reynolds
Curb Records singles